The 1984 Boston Red Sox season was the 84th season in the franchise's Major League Baseball history. The Red Sox finished fourth in the American League East Division with a record of 86 wins and 76 losses, 18 games behind the Detroit Tigers, who went on to win the 1984 World Series.

Offseason 
 December 3, 1983: John Tudor was traded by the Red Sox to the Pittsburgh Pirates for Mike Easler.

Regular season

Highlights 

 In a ceremony at Fenway Park on May 29, the Red Sox honored Joe Cronin and Ted Williams with the franchise's first retired numbers, 4 and 9, respectively.
Tony Armas led American League hitters with 43 home runs, 123 RBIs, 77 extra-base hits and 339 total bases. Despite winning the home run and RBI titles, Armas finished 7th in the 1984 AL MVP voting; Ted Williams had been the most recent player to lead the league in home runs and RBIs without winning MVP honors.
Dwight Evans ranked in the top ten of 11 different offensive categories, leading the league in OPS (.920), games (162), runs (121) and extra-base hits (77, tied with Armas), while ending second in total bases (335); third in slugging percentage (.532) and walks (96); fourth in doubles (37); sixth in on-base percentage(.388); seventh in hits (186) and home runs (32), and eighth in RBIs (104).
Wade Boggs led the league in singles (162) and times on base (292), while ending second in hits (203) and on-base percentage (.407), and third in batting average (.325) and runs (109).
Jim Rice finished second in the league with 122 RBIs, seventh in total bases (307), and ninth in hits (184). He also set a major league record, which still stands, for the most times grounding into a double play during a season, 36.

Season standings

Record vs. opponents

Notable transactions 
 May 25, 1984: Dennis Eckersley and Mike Brumley were traded by the Red Sox to the Chicago Cubs for Bill Buckner.
 June 4, 1984: John Marzano was selected by Boston in the first round (14th pick) of the 1984 Major League Baseball Draft.

Opening Day lineup 

Source:

The Red Sox were defeated on Opening Day by the California Angels, 2–1, with both Angel runs scoring with two outs in the ninth on an error by Boston shortstop Jackie Gutiérrez.

Roster

Game log

Regular season

|-style=background:#fbb
| 9 || April 13 || 2:05p.m. EST || Tigers || 9–13 || Bair (1–0) || Hurst (1–2) || – || 3:11 || 35,179 || 3–6 || L4
|-style=background:#bbb
| — || April 15 || || Tigers || colspan=8 | Postponed (Rain) (Makeup date: August 6)
|-style=background:#bbb
| — || April 16 || || Tigers || colspan=8 | Postponed (Rain) (Makeup date: August 7)
|-

|-style=background:#fbb
| 23 || May 1 || 7:35p.m. EDT || @ Tigers || 2–11 || Wilcox (3–0) || Hurst (3–3) || – || 2:31 || 17,495 || 9–14 || L2
|-style=background:#cfc
| 24 || May 2 || 7:35p.m. EDT || @ Tigers || 5–4 || Brown (1–2) || Berenguer (1–1) || Stanley (4) || 2:33 || 23,085 || 10–14 || W1
|-style=background:#cfc
| 25 || May 3 || 1:30p.m. EDT || @ Tigers || 1–0 || Ojeda (2–2) || Morris (5–1) || – || 2:18 || 22,617 || 11–14 || W2
|-

|-

|-style=background:#bbbfff
|colspan="12"|55th All-Star Game in San Francisco, CA
|-style=background:#fbb
| 98 || July 27 || 5:30p.m. EDT || @ Tigers || 1–9 || Petry (14–4) || Hurst (10–6) || – || 2:30 || N/A || 51–47 || L1
|-style=background:#cfc
| 99 || July 27 || 8:35p.m. EDT || @ Tigers || 4–0 || Ojeda (9–7) || Abbott (3–3) || – || 2:22 || 49,607 || 52–47 || W1
|-style=background:#cfc
| 100 || July 28 || 7:35p.m. EDT || @ Tigers || 3–2 || Stanley (7–6) || Morris (13–7) || Clear (3) || 2:58 || 49,372 || 53–47 || W2
|-style=background:#fbb
| 101 || July 29 || 1:30p.m. EDT || @ Tigers || 0–3 || Wilcox (11–6) || Boyd (5–8) || Hernández (21) || 2:09 || 42,013 || 53–48 || L1
|-

|-style=background:#fbb
| 108 || August 6 || 5:35p.m. EDT || Tigers || 7–9 || López (8–0) || Ojeda (9–9) || Hernández (23) || 3:17 || N/A || 56–52 || L1
|-style=background:#cfc
| 109 || August 6 || 9:27p.m. EDT || Tigers || 10–2 || Clemens (6–4) || Willis (0–2) || – || 2:55 || 31,055 || 57–52 || W1
|-style=background:#cfc
| 110 || August 7 || 5:35p.m. EDT || Tigers || 12–7 || Hurst (11–6) || Morris (14–8) || Clear (5) || || N/A || 58–52 || W2
|-style=background:#fbb
| 111 || August 7 || 8:59p.m. EDT || Tigers || 5–7  || López (9–0) || Gale (1–3) || Hernández (24) || 3:33 || 32,120 || 58–53 || L1
|-style=background:#cfc
| 112 || August 8 || 7:35p.m. EDT || Tigers || 8–0 || Boyd (7–8) || Abbott (3–4) || – || 2:28 || 32,563 || 59–53 || W1
|-

|-

|- style="text-align:center;"
| Legend:       = Win       = Loss       = PostponementBold = Red Sox team member

Statistical leaders 

Source:

Batting 

Source:

Pitching 

Source:

Awards and honors 
 Tony Armas – Silver Slugger Award (OF), AL Player of the Month (June)
 Roger Clemens – AL Pitcher of the Month (August)
 Dwight Evans – Gold Glove Award (OF)
 Jim Rice – Silver Slugger Award (OF)

All-Star Game
 Tony Armas, reserve OF
 Jim Rice, reserve OF

Farm system 

LEAGUE CHAMPIONS: Pawtucket

Source:

References

External links 
1984 Boston Red Sox team page at Baseball Reference
1984 Boston Red Sox season at baseball-almanac.com

Boston Red Sox seasons
Boston Red Sox
Boston Red Sox
Red Sox